Something About Faith  is the sixth studio album by American singer Faith Evans. It was released on Prolific Music Group on October 5, 2010, in the United States. Distributed by E1 Music, the album marked Evans' first independent release, following her departure from Bad Boy in 2003 and her subsequent but short-lived engagement with Capitol Records in 2005. Evans who co-wrote and produced on the majority of Something About Faith, consulted a variety of collaborators to work with her on the album, including duo Carvin & Ivan, Chucky Thompson, Mike City, and Salaam Remi, as well as singer Keyshia Cole, and rappers Redman, Snoop Dogg and Raekwon.

The album earned a generally mixed reception from music critics, many of whom found it pleasant but a departure from the value of previous album The First Lady (2005), citing it as too ordinary, non-controversial and unassuming. Upon its release, Something About Faith debuted at number fifteen on the US Billboard 200 and topped the Independent Albums chart. By August 2012, it had sold 77,000 copies in the United States. The album's first single, "Gone Already", was released in August 2010 and peaked at number 26 on the US Billboard Hot R&B/Hip-Hop Songs chart. The song was nominated for Best Female R&B Vocal Performance for the 2011 Grammy Awards.

Background
In 2001, Evans released her third studio album Faithfully with Bad Boy Records. While it became a success in the United States, Evans felt that the album had received "minimum support" from the label executives and founder Sean "P. Diddy" Combs as Bad Boy transitioned from distributor Arista Records to Universal Music, resulting into the negligence of several Bad Boy releases that year. Citing her wish to move on to be able to work with a new team, Evans asked and received a release from her contract and signed with Capitol Records on which she released the number-one album The First Lady and the Christmas album A Faithful Christmas in 2005. Still signed with Capitol, internal changes at the label and her fourth pregnancy forced Evans into a five-year break and the launch of other pursuits, including the writing and release of her 2008 autobiography Keep the Faith on Grand Central Publishing. Frustrated with her situation, Evans waited until she got a release from Capitol to acquire own imprint Prolific Music Group through E1 Music under which she began work on her next project.

Recording

While she had co-written most of her catalogue and co-produced on several occasions, Evans envisioned herself to be "in the driver’s seat 100% and making for a great, more personal touch with the creative process" of Something About Faith. The singer and husband Todd Russaw took a "very hands on" approach during the making of the album, while using their relationships in calling different songwriters and producers to work with Evans on new songs. Several longtime contributors answered their request, including Chucky Thompson, Gil Smith II, duo Carvin & Ivan and co-producer Johnnie "Smurf" Smith who joined an eclectic group of noted but new collbaborators, including Salaam Remi, Mike City, and Malik Pendleton, among others. Musically, Evans was looking for a familiar sound for the album. In an interview with Blues & Soul magazine, she said: "I like to describe this album as the new adventures of the old Faith. Because to be honest – though my voice has matured and gotten stronger, to where it has much more depth to it these days – I really just wanted to deliver what it is that the true Faith Evans fans out there wanna hear from me. Which is my style of arrangements, my style of stacking harmonies."

Her most feature-heavy album up to then, Evans asked singer Keyshia Cole and rapper Raekwon to appear on her album when they wanted her to sing on their projects, prompting Evans to suggest an even swap after recording. She also reached out to rapper Snoop Dogg after meeting him at the taping of "We Are the World 25 for Haiti" in February 2010. Evans later commented on the process that "it was just a good vibe and a personal touch, the fact that it’s like wow, I’m really calling to see if I could clear this sample, and of course I’m ultimately letting my team handle it. But when you do things yourself, it might happen a little faster [...] it just kinda came together the way that I envisioned it, but not having done this before in this way, I didn’t know it would be, but it’s exactly how I wanted it to be." When asked what prompted her to title the album Something About Faith, again using her given name after Faith (1995), Keep the Faith (1998), Faithfully (2001) and A Faithful Christmas (2005), Evans further remarked: "I thought I ran out of ways to use my name in the title. The way this project came together [...] everyone was saying 'dag, they love you.' Everyone around me was saying, 'there’s something about you,' hence Something About Faith. It just came out of thin air [...] For this album I’m giving them the new adventures of the same old Faith, that’s how I like to describe it."

Promotion
Something About Faith was preceded by the buzz single "Way You Move" featuring Snoop Dogg which was released on June 29, 2010. It reached number 65 on the Japan Hot 100, but failed to chart in the United States. It was followed by lead single "Gone Already." The song was released on August 10, 2010. It received a warm reception from critics – one of whom listed the "Toni Braxton-worthy breakup ballad" as one of the "standouts" on Something About Faith. Promoted by live performances on The Wendy Williams Show on October 8, 2010, and The Mo'Nique Show on November 12, 2010, "Gone Already" spent seventeen weeks on the US Billboard Hot R&B/Hip-Hop Songs chart where it peaked at number 26. The song was also promoted with the release of a music video on Evans' and E1 Music's official YouTube channels. In further promotion of the album, a high definition music video for "Right Here" was released on Evans' official YouTube account on February 14, 2011.

Critical reception

Something About Faith received generally mixed to positive reviews from most music critics. SoulTracks editor Melody Charles found that the album reward Evans's "fans for their loyalty with some of her most confident and compelling music yet [...] For those who need a reminder, or for the fans who've felt bereft of her vocal renderings since The First Lady, [...] Evans' fifth CD marks a welcome return and offers that special 'something' you've been waiting for." Ed Masley from The Arizona Republic stated that "there's a lot to like" and went on to praise her "honeyed vocals" on "The Way You Move", but despite feeling that "the better songs could definitely hold their own on any future greatest hits collection" he went on to note that "like a lot of R&B releases, it may be a bit on the top-heavy side".

On the contrary Mark Edward Nero of About.com described the album as being "ordinary, non-controversial and unassuming" and felt that Evans' voice had been "toned down" and "harnessed so much that there's very few thickly passionate or dramatic moments [...] and some songs have such an overproduced feel to them that Faith's essence gets lost in the mix" despite noting that "at her best, she's a compelling, top-tier vocalist whose luscious voice has the power to mesmerize." Likewise, Melanie Sims of The Canadian Press described the album as being a "batch of soulful yet predictable ballads." However, Sims praised the "elegant sound" of "Gone Already", the "super smooth "Right Here" and bedtime ballad "Baby Lay", before going on to state that "Troubled World" is "the only track that manages to show the true depth and richness of the voice that has gotten Evans this far". Allmusic editor Andy Kellman described the album as "pleasant" but "merely decent" and stated that it "does not pack the lasting value boasted by Evans' most recent work." Similarly, Natalie Shaw from BBC Music wrote that "if the gloss is intended as escapism, it doesn’t sound like she is having much fun. And at 16 tracks, Something About Faith is exceedingly filler-heavy."

Commercial performance
Something About Faith debuted at number fifteen on the US Billboard 200, number four on the Billboard Top R&B/Hip-Hop Albums chart and at number one on the Billboard Independent Albums with first-week sales of 23,586 copies. By August 2012, the album had sold 77,000 copies in the United States, according to Nielsen SoundScan. Elsewhere, Something About Faith failed to chart.

Track listing
Credits from UrbanBridgez.com and BestBuy.com

Notes
  denotes additional producer
  denotes co-producer

Sample credits
 "Everyday Struggle" embodies interpolation of "Either Way" as written by Harvey Mason Jr.
 "The Love in Me" includes a sample of "Easter Clothes" as written by Salaam Remi.

Personnel

Bert Padell, Trevor Baptiste – Management
Alejandro Barajas – Mixing Assistant
Ivan "Orthodox" Barias – Engineer, Instrumentation, Producer
Joe Basurto – Design Consultant
Darrell Robinson, Carvin "Ransum" Haggins, Anthony Bell – Producer
Charlie Bereal – Guitar, Guitar Overdubs
Kristene Bernard – Make-Up
Derek Blanks – Photography
Ben Briggs III – Additional Production, Associate Executive Producer, Drums, Engineer, Mixing, Producer, Programming
Patrick "Devinaire" Briggs – Keyboards, Producer
Tyler Nicolo, Daniel Laporte, Joe the Butcher, Carvin Haggins, Gleyder "Gee" Disla, Shon Brooks – Engineer
"You Can Ask" Giz, Bob Horn, Eric "Ebo" Butler – Mixing
Corey Latif, Ebony Carr-Baskin – backing vocals
Mike City – Instrumentation, Producer
Jeffry Rameau, Patrick Hewlett, Brandon Henderson, George Gumbs, Gerald Deus, Fabian Cooke, A.J. Clarke – Assistant Engineer
Don Lee Samuels, D.J. Rogers Jr., Kirk Moore, Richard Glass, Toni Coleman, Danny Coakley, Alex Clarke – Vocals
Brian Culberston – Fender Rhodes, Piano, Synthesizer
Laurel Dann – A&R
Marleny Dominguez – Label Direction
Thomas Drayton – bass guitar
Faith Evans – A&R, Executive Producer, Producer, Vocal Arrangement, Vocals (Background)
Kenny Olsen, Chuck Gibson – Guitar
Paul Grosso – Creative Director, Design
Bernie Grundman – Mastering
Dae Dae Haddon – Drums
IBE – Engineer, Instrumentation, Producer
Eric Ingram – Dubs, Guitar (Bass)
Derek Lafayette – Marketing
Bianca Lewis – Grooming
Lex Lipsitz – Percussion
Arnold Mischkulnig – Mastering, Mixing
Bishop Moore – Consultant
Malik Pendleton – Instrumentation, Mixing, Producer
Darrell Miller, Fox Rothschild, Julian Petty – Legal Advisor
Shanell Red – Vocal Arrangement
Salaam Remi – Arranger, Bass, Drums, Guitar, Producer
Kye Russaw – Assistant Engineer, Engineer, Instrumentation, Producer
Todd Russaw – A&R, Executive Producer, Management
Gil Smith II – Additional Production
Johnnie "Smurf" Smith – Additional Production, Keyboards
Dee "Pitboss" Sonaram – A&R, Promoter
Staybent Krunk A-Delic – Programming
Kyle Stewart – Engineer, Instrumentation, Producer
Shadow Stokes – Promoter
Chucky Thompson – Instrumentation, Moog Synthesizer, Producer
Brad Todd – Additional Production, Engineer, Executive Producer, Mixing, Producer
Mickel Valere – Guitar (Acoustic)
Keonte Vincent – Engineer, Vocals (Background)

Charts

Release history

References

External links
 FaithEvansMusic.com 
 Faith Evans at MySpace
 

2010 albums
Faith Evans albums
E1 Music albums
Albums produced by Salaam Remi